Glenea francisi is a species of beetle in the family Cerambycidae. It was described by Karl-Ernst Hüdepohl in 1990.

References

francisi
Beetles described in 1990